The 2014–15 Primera B de Chile was the 65th completed season of the Primera B de Chile.

San Luis de Quillota was the tournament's champion.

League table

References

External links
 RSSSF 2014

Primera B de Chile seasons
Primera B
Chil
Chil